Nik Mohd Shahrul Azim bin Abdul Halim (born 30 December 1990) is a Malaysian professional footballer. He is a versatile defender who mainly operate as a right-back and sometimes as a centre-back.

Club career

Early career
Nik Shahrul began his football career with Kelantan playing for and was the captain of the President's Cup team in 2010.

Kelantan
In 2012, while Nik Shahrul was playing with Kelantan President’s Cup, Bojan Hodak was spotted his talent to be included in the senior team. His performances have been improving consistently and he has certainly earned his stripes to be part of the Kelantan senior team first XI. Kelantan claim treble winners with Malaysia Cup win against ATM during 2012 season. Even though he was young, he was given the responsibility to take care the defence with Obinna Nwaneri in the 2012 Malaysia Super League season. He was lifted as a hero after denying Indra Putra Mahayuddin attempt for a goal at the last minute that could have made Kelantan lost 3–4 on the first leg of Malaysia FA Cup semi final at Sultan Muhammad IV Stadium. After the match, he said "I would rather be injured than let my team concede another goal.”to Astro Arena. On 3 August 2016, he had to rest for at least 2 months after he had an injury during the match against Felda United when he clashed with Syamim Yahya at the end of the first half and was replaced with Noor Hazrul Mustafa.

For 2018 season, Nik Shahrul made his season debut in 1–2 defeat against Melaka United on 3 February 2018.

Negeri Sembilan (loan)
On 22 May 2017, during the 2017 second transfer window, Nik Shahrul agreed to join Negeri Sembilan on a 6-month loan move from Kelantan until the end of 2017 season. He made his debut on 24 May 2017, playing against Johor Darul Ta'zim II in a 1–1 draw.

PKNS
On 19 May 2018, Nik Shahrul signed a contract with PKNS for an undisclosed fee. On 23 May, he made his debut for PKNS in a 1–1 draw against Melaka United.

Kuala Lumpur City
In 2020, Nik Shahrul has joined Kuala Lumpur City after his contract with PKNS expired. He made 9 league appearances during his debut season. On 12 January 2021, Nik Shahrul extended his contract with the club for another season.

International career
He has been called up by Ong Kim Swee for Malaysia national under-23 football team. He also was called up by K. Rajagobal for the friendly matches and 2015 AFC Asian Cup qualification.

Career statistics

Club

Honours

Club
Kelantan U21
 Malaysia President Cup: 2010

Kelantan
 Malaysia Super League: 2012
 Malaysia Cup: 2012
 Malaysia FA Cup: 2012, 2013; runner-up 2015
 Malaysia Charity Shield runner-up: 2012, 2013

International
Malaysia U23
 Merdeka Tournament: 2013

References

External links
 
 

1990 births
Living people
Malaysian footballers
Kelantan FA players
Negeri Sembilan FA players
PKNS F.C. players
Kuala Lumpur City F.C. players
People from Kelantan
Malaysian people of Malay descent
Association football defenders